The Dikstra Buttresses are a group of summits rising to about  on the western side of the Douglas Range, northern Alexander Island, Antarctica. Surveyed by the British Antarctic Survey (BAS), 1975–76, they were named by the UK Antarctic Place-Names Committee in 1980 after Barry James Dikstra, a BAS geophysicist at Adelaide Island and Rothera Station, 1974–77.

References 

Rock formations on Alexander Island